Acacia brownii, commonly known as heath wattle, is an erect or spreading shrub which is endemic to eastern Australia.

Description

Taxonomy
The species was first formally described by Robert Brown in 1813 as Acacia acicularis, but that name had already been applied to a different species. In 1817 Poiret published Mimosa brownei as a replacement name. The current name was published by botanist Ernst Gottlieb von Steudel in 1821 as part of the work Phanerogams. Nomenclator Botanicus, citing Brown's species, but not Poiret's. It was reclassified as Racosperma brownii by Leslie Pedley in 1987 then transferred back to genus Acacia in 2006. Other synonyms include; Acacia acicularis , Acacia pugioniformis , Mimosa brownei, Acacia brownei and Acacia ulicifolia var. brownii.
It is similar in appearance and closely related to Acacia ulicifolia, of which it was once thought to have been a variety.

Distribution
The species occurs on sandy or clay loam in dry sclerophyll forest, woodland or heath in southern and eastern Victoria, New South Wales and Queensland. It is found throughout the Great Dividing Range from around the Grampians in Victoria in the south through New South Wales and up to around Burra Burri in Queensland.

See also
 List of Acacia species

References

brownii
Flora of New South Wales
Flora of Queensland
Flora of Victoria (Australia)
Fabales of Australia
Plants described in 1821